The Chamber Music III, The Nocturnal Dances of Don Juanquixote (sometimes Juanquijote or Juan Quixote; in Finnish:), Op. 58, is a concertante composition for cello and string orchestra by the Finnish composer Aulis Sallinen, who wrote the piece from 1985–86 on commission of the Naantali Music Festival. The piece was first performed by cellist Arto Noras (the dedicatee) on 15 June 1986 in Naantali, Finland, with Vladimir Ashkenazy conducting the English Chamber Orchestra. The pseudo-literary title—a compound of iconic, fictional characters Don Juan (the libertine and seducer) and Don Quixote (the bumbling knight-errant)—recalls, but does not quote, the Op. 20 and Op. 35 tone poems of Richard Strauss, respectively. The piece is the most popular and recorded of Sallinen's series of nine (as of 2018) Chamber Musics.

Instrumentation 
According to the publisher, Novello & Co, Chamber Music III is scored for the following (Note: numbers are minimums):
 Soloist: cello
Strings: 7 violins (4 first and 3 second), 2 violas (divided), 2 cellos (divided), and 1 double bass

Recordings 
To date, four cellists have recorded Chamber Music III across six recordings. Arto Noras, the dedicatee, accounts for half of these performances, including the piece's premiere recording, which is from 1988 with Okko Kamu conducting the Finlandia Sinfonietta on the Finlandia label; as well as its most recent, in 2014, for Ondine's complete recording of the Sallinen Chamber Musics. A notable detractor of Nocturnal Dances, however, is the American Record Guide's Tom Lehman, who terms the piece a "monstrosity" in his review of the Turovsky recording: "This 20-minute string of disjointed, pretentious, saprophagous, smirking postmodern allusions and distortions (of 'pop' cliches as well as 'classical' music)," he continues, "Is simply awful. Horrendous. Hideous. Ghastly."

Notes, references, and sources

Notes

References

Sources 

Books

CD liner notes

Journal articles
 
 
 
 
 

Compositions by Aulis Sallinen
1986 compositions
Compositions for cello and orchestra